Milan Stojanović (Serbian Cyrillic: Милан Стојановић; born 10 May 1988) is a Serbian football player who currently plays for FC Okzhetpes in the Kazakhstan First League. His favoured position is as a right midfielder.

Career
On 26 January 2018, Stojanović extended his contract with Shakhter Karagandy.
On 18 January 2019, Stojanović returned to Kazakhstan, signing for FC Okzhetpes.

References

External links
 
 

Living people
1988 births
Serbian footballers
Serbian expatriate footballers
Association football midfielders
Sportspeople from Leskovac
Serbian SuperLiga players
Kazakhstan Premier League players
FK Vlasina players
K.S.C. Lokeren Oost-Vlaanderen players
FK Bežanija players
FK Radnik Surdulica players
FK Sloga Petrovac na Mlavi players
FK Borac Banja Luka players
FK Metalac Gornji Milanovac players
FC Turan players
FC Okzhetpes players
Serbian expatriate sportspeople in Belgium
Serbian expatriate sportspeople in Bosnia and Herzegovina
Serbian expatriate sportspeople in Kazakhstan
Expatriate footballers in Belgium
Expatriate footballers in Bosnia and Herzegovina
Expatriate footballers in Kazakhstan